Cookin' at Carlos I is a live album by saxophonist/composer Benny Carter recorded in 1989 and released by the MusicMasters label.

Reception

AllMusic reviewer Scott Yanow stated "During the late '80s up to the present, Benny Carter (now an octogenarian) has recorded a string of consistently excellent and frequently superb CDs for Music Masters. This particular effort is a rare live recording for Carter with his regular group ... The repertoire is typical of his club performances ... A special treat is Carter's trumpet solo on "Time for the Blues"; otherwise his wonderful alto dominates this fine set".

Track listing
 "You'd Be So Nice to Come Home To" (Cole Porter) – 8:11
 "All the Things You Are" (Jerome Kern, Oscar Hammerstein II) – 9:07	
 "Key Largo" (Benny Carter, Karl Suessdorf, Leah Worth) – 8:40
 "Just Friends" (John Klenner, Sam M. Lewis) – 8:05
 "My Romance" (Richard Rodgers, Lorenz Hart) – 10:22
 "'S Wonderful" (George Gershwin, Ira Gershwin) – 8:15
 "Time for the Blues" (Benny Carter) – 8:18

Personnel 
Benny Carter – alto saxophone, trumpet
Richard Wyands – piano
Lisle Atkinson – bass
Al Harewood – drums

References 

1990 live albums
Benny Carter live albums
MusicMasters Records live albums